The Queensland Fire and Emergency Services (QFES) is the primary provider of fire and emergency services in Queensland, Australia. The QFES was established in 2013 to improve the coordination and planning of emergency services, adopting an "all hazards" approach to emergency management.

QFES headquarters are located in the Emergency Services Complex in Kedron, Brisbane.

The Department of Community Safety formally had joint coordination control until a merger in 2014.

 Queensland Fire and Rescue Service (QFRS) 2014–present 
 Queensland Fire and Rescue Authority 1997–2001 
 Queensland Fire Service 1990–1997
 Rural Fire Service (RFSQ) 1927–present
 Queensland State Emergency Service (QSES) 1974–present
 Civil Defense Organisation 1961–1973

The 20,200 QFES personnel are 2,200 full-time professional firefighters and 2,000 on call auxiliary Firefighters, 9,000 Rural Fire Service volunteers and 6,000 State Emergency Service volunteers. QFES front-line operations is supported by a number of non-operational administration staff throughout the State.

The minister responsible is the Honourable Mark Ryan, Minister for Fire and Emergency Services.

QFES is currently led by Commissioner Greg Leach, formerly a member of the Country Fire Authority, Ambulance Victoria and the Metropolitan Fire Brigade (Melbourne).

History
The QFES is the result of 150 years of evolution in Queensland's firefighting services; in fact the QFS was born in 1860 after a fire destroyed a Brisbane cabinet making workshop. The early years were tough for the Brisbane Fire Brigade and it was not until 1889 that the first firemen was employed.

The first legislation for rural fire management was the Act to Prevent the Careless Use of Fire 1865, and for state fire management, the Fire Brigades Act 1876. In 1990, the Queensland Fire Service and the Rural Fires Council were formed replacing the 81 Fire Boards in local government areas and the Rural Fires Board; this was the first step in creating a single fire service for Queensland.

In 1997, it became the Queensland Fire and Rescue Authority and 2001 saw another name change to the Queensland Fire and Rescue Service.

In 2013, QFRS merged with EMQ and the Corporate Services Division of the Department of Community Safety to become the current Queensland Fire and Emergency Services, encompassing Queensland Fire and Rescue Service, parts of the State Emergency Service, Emergency Management and the Rural Fire Service.

Organisation

The Queensland Fire and Rescue Service professional Firefighters ensure a balance between the reduction of risk and enhancement of community resilience, whilst providing effective response and recovery capabilities in the primary hazard response areas of: fire and explosion; accident; rescue; environmental and imminent or declared disaster.

The Queensland Fire and Emergency Services provides specialist personnel with the skills and ability to provide combat support services for: land, marine, air and urban search and rescue; crime scene and forensic searches; missing person searches; animal disease outbreaks and communications.

Queensland Fire and Rescue Service

The Queensland Fire and Rescue Service is made up of approximately 2200 professional and 2000 Auxiliary (part-time) firefighters that are responsible for responding to almost every emergency. They are highly trained and work in a command structure with high standards to ensure safety. They have a proud history of protecting all Queenslanders and are highly valued by the community. They look after Queensland's Assets and population. To become a professional Firefighter involves a rigorous selection process, after which successful candidates undertake a four-month recruitment course. They then go on to partake in many years of intense study and training in all disciplines of rescue, wildfires, structural fires and major emergencies.

Rural Fire Service 
The Rural Fire Service (RFS), made up of approximately 110,000 volunteers (90,000 active), approximately 1400 rural fire brigades. They are mainly responsible for responding to bushfires and have some land management capability. The current QFES model means that volunteers will support the Fire & Rescue Service in any emergency as required.

Fire Prevention and Fire and Rescue 

Queensland's professional Firefighters undertake a range of planning and preparation activities throughout the year. They are trained in Structural Firefighting, Wildland (forest and grassland) fires, vertical rescue, swift water rescue, road crash rescue, confined space rescue, trench rescue and urban search and rescue (USAR) and Hazardous material mitigation.
Fire hazard (vegetation fires) mitigation and response is the primary role of Fire and Rescue and Rural Fire Service in the outer areas. Rural Fire Brigades, in conjunction with Rural Fire Service permanent staff, Fire & rescue Service, local councils, national parks rangers, and local landholders, undertake a range of planning and preparation activities throughout the year to ensure communities are well prepared for the fire season.

One of these activities is hazard reduction burns. Hazard reduction burns use fire under controlled circumstances to reduce excess vegetation and minimise the potential for bushfires to get out of control.

Community education 
There is an increasing awareness that timely and effective fire prevention and education saves lives and property. Fire and Rescue Service professional firefighters visit many schools and engage in a range of community education activities to ensure the community is prepared for a range of emergencies.

Permits to Light Fire 
The Fire and Emergency Services Regulation 2011 regulates the use of fire by not allowing fires to be lit without a specific permit. Fire Wardens and authorised fire officers manage the permit to light fire system.

A permit to light fire is required for any fire that exceeds two metres in any direction and can be acquired free of charge from a fire warden.

Fighting Bushfires 
Professional firefighters cover the major population areas across most of Queensland. Rural Fire Brigade volunteers respond to the outbreak of fires outside of the fire and rescue coverage and within their local area and in surrounding areas in support of other rural bushfire brigades and emergency services. QFES is made up of two distinct fire services and when these services are bought together, they are used to provide a stronger, more efficient response to large scale bushfires.

Deployments and assistance during disasters 
All elements of QFES are often sent on deployment to assist other states during disasters. Both professional and volunteer services are also used for state-based deployments.

State Emergency Service
The Queensland State Emergency Service (SES) is a statewide organisation of volunteers from a variety of backgrounds who respond to emergencies and disasters across the State as needed. They are trained and equipped by local councils and QFES, to help their communities across a range of functions, and their primary purpose is to assist the community. The SES is designed to empower people to help themselves and others in their community in times of emergency and disaster. The basic concept is one of self-help and mutual assistance within each community.

SES members also assist other emergency services with provision of: emergency lighting; emergency welfare services; management of traffic at emergency scenes and emergency communications.

Leadership
The following list chronologically records those who have held the post of Commissioner of the Queensland Fire and Emergency Service.

Ranks and structure
The QFES employs both professional firefighters and on call paid Auxiliary firefighters to staff its more than 240 urban fire and rescue stations.

Ranks of the Queensland Fire and Rescue Services are as follows:

Queensland Fire and Rescue Service Professional Firefighters
 4th Class Firefighter –  Black epaulette with white embroidered "FIRE & RESCUE"
 3rd Class Firefighter –  Black epaulette with white embroidered "FIRE & RESCUE" and single chevron
 2nd Class Firefighter –  Black epaulette with white embroidered "FIRE & RESCUE" and double chevron
 Qualified 1st Class Firefighter –  Black epaulette with white embroidered "FIRE & RESCUE" and triple chevron
 Senior Firefighter –  Black epaulette with white embroidered "FIRE & RESCUE", triple chevron and gold crossed axes
 Leading Firefighter –  Black epaulette with white embroidered "FIRE & RESCUE","LEADING FIREFIGHTER" with triple chevron and gold crossed axes - as of 2019, this rank is being phased out
 Station Officer –  Black epaulette with white embroidered "FIRE & RESCUE" and double impeller
 Inspector –  Black epaulette with white embroidered "FIRE & RESCUE" and triple impeller
 Superintendent –  Black epaulette with white embroidered "FIRE & RESCUE", single impeller and crown
 Chief Superintendent –  Black epaulette with white embroidered "FIRE & RESCUE", double impeller and crown
 Assistant Commissioner –  Black epaulette with white embroidered "Fire and Emergency Services", crossed branches with laurels
 Deputy Commissioner –  Black epaulette with white embroidered "Fire and Emergency Services", crossed branches with laurels and a single impeller
 Commissioner –  Black epaulette with white embroidered "Fire and Emergency Services", crossed branches with laurels and a single crown

Fire and Rescue Service Auxiliary Firefighter 
 Auxiliary Support –  Black epaulette with red embroidered 'FIRE & RESCUE' and 'AUXILIARY SUPPORT'
 Firefighter –  Black epaulette with red embroidered 'FIRE & RESCUE' (Grade 1 & 2)
 Firefighter (5 Years) –  Black epaulette with red embroidered 'FIRE & RESCUE' with single bar
 Firefighter (10 Years) –  Black epaulette with red embroidered 'FIRE & RESCUE' with double bar
 Firefighter (15 Years) –  Black epaulette with red embroidered 'FIRE & RESCUE' with triple bar
 Lieutenant –  Black epaulette with red embroidered 'FIRE & RESCUE' and single impeller
 Captain  –  Black epaulette with red embroidered 'FIRE & RESCUE' and double impeller

Fire Communications 
 Fire Communications Officer 1.1 - Ink Navy epaulette with white embroidered "COMMUNICATIONS" and lightning bolt
 Fire Communications Officer 1.2 - Ink Navy epaulette with white embroidered "COMMUNICATIONS", a single chevron and lightning bolt
 Fire Communications Officer 1.3 - Ink Navy epaulette with white embroidered "COMMUNICATIONS", two chevrons and lightning bolt
 Fire Communications Officer 1.4 - Ink Navy epaulette with white embroidered "COMMUNICATIONS", three chevrons and lightning bolt
 Fire Communications Officer 1.5 - Ink Navy epaulette with white embroidered "COMMUNICATIONS", three chevrons, lightning bolt and single bar
 Fire Communications Supervisor - Ink Navy epaulette with white embroidered "COMMUNICATIONS", double impeller and lightning bolt
 Fire Communications Manager - Ink Navy epaulette with white embroidered "COMMUNICATIONS", triple impeller and lightning bolt

Fire & Rescue Scientific Branch

Volunteers
 Volunteer Scientific Officer –  Black epaulette with light blue embroidered 'SCIENTIFIC'
 Volunteer Scientific Officer (5 Years) – Black epaulette with light blue embroidered 'SCIENTIFIC' with single bar
 Volunteer Scientific Officer (10 Years) – Black epaulette with light blue embroidered 'SCIENTIFIC' with double bar
 Volunteer Scientific Officer (15 Years) – Black epaulette with light blue embroidered 'SCIENTIFIC' with triple bar

Volunteers (Brisbane Based)
 Scientific Support Officer – Black epaulette with light blue embroidered 'SCIENTIFIC'
 Scientific Support Officer (5 Years) – Black epaulette with light blue embroidered 'SCIENTIFIC' with single bar
 Scientific Support Officer (10 Years) – Black epaulette with light blue embroidered 'SCIENTIFIC' with double bar
 Scientific Support Officer (15 Years) – Black epaulette with light blue embroidered 'SCIENTIFIC' with triple bar

Senior Officers
 Inspector –  Black epaulette with white embroidered "FIRE & RESCUE" and triple impeller
 Superintendent - lack epaulette with white embroidered "FIRE & RESCUE" and single impeller and crown
 Chief Superintendent –  Black epaulette with white embroidered "FIRE & RESCUE" and double impeller and crown

Rural Fire Service (Paid and non-paid staff)

Volunteers
 Member – Ink Navy epaulette with yellow embroidered 'RFS'
 Firefighter – Ink Navy epaulette with yellow embroidered 'RFS' and single bar
 Senior Firefighter – Ink Navy epaulette with yellow embroidered 'RFS' and double bar
 Crew Leader - Ink Navy epaulette with yellow embroidered 'RFS' and triple bar
 Officer – Ink Navy epaulette with yellow embroidered 'RFS' and single impeller
 1st Officer – Ink Navy epaulette with yellow embroidered 'RFS' and double impeller

Representational Positions
 Deputy Group Officer – Ink Navy epaulette with yellow embroidered 'RFS' and single impeller with bar
 Group Officer – Ink Navy epaulette with yellow embroidered 'RFS' and double impeller with bar

Staff (Paid)
 Rural Officer 1 – Ink Navy epaulette with white embroidered 'RFS' with single impeller
 Rural Officer 2 – Ink Navy epaulette with white embroidered 'RFS' with double impeller
 Rural Inspector – Ink Navy epaulette with white embroidered 'RFS' and triple impeller
 Rural Superintendent – Ink Navy epaulette with white embroidered 'RFS' single impeller and crown
 Rural Chief Superintendent – Ink Navy epaulette with white embroidered 'RFS' and double impeller and crown
 Rural Assistant Commissioner – Ink Navy epaulette with white embroidered 'FIRE & EMERGENCY' and wreath with crossed branches

State Emergency Service (Paid and non-paid staff)
Ranks on SES

Volunteers

Community Member – Ink Navy epaulette with orange embroidered 'SES'
Field Operations Member – Ink Navy epaulette with orange embroidered 'SES' and single chevron
Senior Field Operations Member – Ink Navy epaulette with orange embroidered 'SES' and double chevrons
Leading Field Operations Member - Ink Navy epaulette with orange embroidered 'SES' and triple chevrons
Deputy Group Leader – Ink Navy epaulette with orange embroidered 'SES' and single cyclone
Group Leader – Ink Navy epaulette with orange embroidered 'SES' and double cyclone

Representational Positions

Deputy Local Controller – Ink Navy epaulette with orange embroidered 'SES' and double cyclone with single bar
Local Controller – Ink Navy epaulette with orange embroidered 'SES' and double cyclone with double bar

Staff (Paid)

SES Officer Grade One – Ink Navy epaulette with white embroidered 'SES' and single white cyclone
SES Officer Grade Two – Ink Navy epaulette with white embroidered 'SES' and double white cyclone
Area Director – Ink Navy epaulette with white embroidered 'SES' and triple white cyclone
Executive Manager – Ink Navy epaulette with white embroidered 'SES' with single white cyclone and crown
Regional Director - Ink Navy epaulette with white embroidered 'SES' with double white cyclone and crown
SES Assistant Commissioner - Ink Navy epaulette with white embroidered 'FIRE & EMERGENCY' and wreath with crossed branches

Honours and awards

Medals
Queensland Fire and Emergency Service medals and ribbons are worn in accordance with the strict Order of Precedence below, from centre to right.  The award with the highest precedence is worn closest to the centre of the chest and on the top row of ribbon bars when more than four awards are worn.

Citations
Citations are worn centrally, 5mm above the nameplate on the right breast pocket of service shirts, tunics and coats. The Order of Precedence for Queensland Fire and Emergency Service citations is as follows:

References

External links
QFES Official site
Rural Fire Service site
State Emergency Service site
Queensland Emergency Services and safety
QFES Official Twitter Page
QFES Official Facebook Page
Legislation

Fire and rescue services of Australia
Emergency services in Queensland
1860 establishments in Australia